Limketkai Center (Chinese: 林市場偕中心, or 林克凱中心) is a shopping mall in Cagayan de Oro, Philippines. Known by the locals as Ketkai, it is owned and developed by Limketkai and Sons, Inc., the largest factory and business district developer in the city.

Located in the city's central business district, particularly within the mixed-use 40 hectare Limketkai Center in Lapasan, the sprawling, two-storey mall has over 500 tenants, offering stores, boutique shops, fast-food chains and restaurants. It also offers facilities including four movie theatres, food courts, entertainment and day-care centers, spas and clinics.

 The first Robinsons Mall in the city, Robinsons Cagayan de Oro, is also located inside the mall complex. Limketkai Center also has a Mass every Sunday at the Our Lady of Manaoag Church.

Anchor Stores & Services

Robinsons Cagayan de Oro
Located at the North Concourse of this mall complex, Robinsons Cagayan de Oro is the first Robinsons Mall in Cagayan de Oro which was opened in 2002. It houses Robinsons Appliances, Robinsons Department Store, Robinsons Supermarket, Daiso, Handyman and anchor shops that is hosted by Robinsons Malls.

Limketkai Luxe Hotel 
Limketkai Luxe Hotel, is a tower hotel that is located inside the mall complex. The 18-floor structure offers 100 guest rooms. The hotel is currently the second tallest tower in Cagayan de Oro. The box-type tower is an iconic landmark to the city that is stand in solid gold, resembling Cagayan de Oro as the City of Golden Friendship.

Originally, Limketkai Luxe Hotel is planned as twin-towers, named as Tower 1 and Tower 2. The Tower 1 that is currently existing was completed and was opened in 2013, while the Tower 2 should add for another 216 guest rooms and 36 floors. However, the construction for the Tower 2 is currently on hold.

Shopwise 
A two-level hypermarket operated by Rustan's Supercenters Inc., and is one of the mall's anchor stores.

Our Lady of Manaoag Chapel 
Since the 1990s, Masses have been celebrated at Limketkai; first near the South Concourse entrance, then at the Limketkai Atrium. In 2014, the Masses were moved to another location - this time to a brand-new chapel inside the mall's East Annex next to Shopwise. The chapel is dedicated to Our Lady of the Rosary of Manaoag.

Marks & Spencer 
Marks & Spencer is a British multinational retailer which operates under Stores Specialist Inc. (SSI) of Rustan's. The branch in Limketkai is their first store in the city.

All Home Cagayan de Oro 
All Home has opened inside the complex. AllHome is its main anchor.

Entertainment

Atrium 
Limketkai Mall is home to an activity venue called the Atrium. It has a 4,500 seat capacity, and has hosted many local, national and international conventions and concerts in the city yearly. It was also here where the city local candidates held their debate during the 2016 elections.

The Rotunda 
The Rotunda is a circular event venue.

Cinemas 
The mall houses four cinemas with one featuring Dolby Atmos, the first in the city.

Rosario Arcade 
Rosario Arcade, an alfresco area and a popular bar strip in Cagayan de Oro which has been a night life and dining destination in the city.

Expansion
Since its opening in 1991, Limketkai Mall has been under constant renovation and expansion, in order to compete with the national retailers such as SM and Ayala that expand their businesses in the city.

In 2003, the mall made its general renovation in response to the newly-built SM City Cagayan de Oro (now SM City CDO Uptown). The mostly one-storey, open-air shopping center was converted into a two-storey, fully air-conditioned mall. The renovated main mall was connected then to Robinsons Big R (now Robinsons Cagayan de Oro) for the convenience of shoppers crossing between the two malls.

Most recent expansions include the East Concourse Wing, which houses high-end fashion and lifestyle shops. Connecting the East Concourse Wing is a value-hypermarket, Shopwise, which has an indoor automated car park on its first level offering 500 slots.

The Green Lane, which surrounds the Atrium, is a new expansion for high-end shops connecting the East Concourse to the South Concourse. The new glass-clad promenade was built directly above the South Promenade and is lined with trees and plants, and is targeted as an upscale greenbelt corner.

The Limketkai Skywalk connects the main mall to other buildings of the complex, such as the newly renovated and expanded Rosario Strip, Limketkai Luxe Hotel, Gateway Tower, and Gateway Park.

Meanwhile, a four-storey building with leasable space and two basements serving as parking space called Limketkai Mall Module-2 BPO & Cyberpark Building, is now under construction in front of Robinsons Cagayan de Oro. This building expansion will be connected then to the mall's North Concourse.

Another multilevel building is said to rise soon at the mall's parking D area between Shell's gasoline station and The Loop showroom. This building will be connected to the mall's South Concourse.

Incidents and controversies

Rosario Arcade bombing 
A bomb explosion ripped through a row of upscale restaurants at Rosario Arcade on the night of July 26, 2013. The bombing killed at least six and injured 48 others, many of whom are members of the Philippine College of Chest Physicians, who were attending their national midyear convention held at nearby Grand Caprice.

Investigations found out that it was the Abu Sayyaf who led the incident and pointed out Renierlo Dongon as the primary suspect of the bombing. Dongon had served as a leader of the Khilafa Islamiya and once arrested sometime in 2013 and is connected as well to Abu Sayyaf.

In the midst of the Bohol clashes, Dongon, along with his wife Supt. Maria Cristina Nobleza, was later caught by the authorities on April 23, 2017.

Casino proposal 
Since 2009, concerns have been raised from several church groups and organizations after a casino was planned to open inside the mall complex. The casino would be operated under Diamond Millenium Corporation, represented by Lorenzo U. Limketkai, and have a PAGCOR e-Games Station. It would be placed inside the Lifestyle Podium next to the Limketkai Luxe Hotel, which is currently under construction and was set to open in January 2018.

The Archdiocese of Cagayan de Oro expressed their opposition to this proposal, saying that the chapel could be removed and Mass would no longer be celebrated if the plan were to go ahead. The Committee on Trade and Commerce of the city's local government is yet to review the proposal.

Gallery

See also

List of shopping malls in the Philippines
List of largest shopping malls in the Philippines
Cagayan de Oro
Robinsons Malls
Vista Malls

References

External links
Limketkai Center Official Website
Limketkai Mall Map

Shopping malls in Cagayan de Oro
Shopping malls established in 1991